The Women's Single event of the Bowling at the 2017 World Games will be held on 21 July 2017.

Single Women

Qualifications

Competition bracket

Results 

In a competition doping test after the medal ceremony, Buethner tested positive for a banned substance. As a result of the positive doping test, Buethner was stripped of the gold medal. Kelly Kulick, who originally won silver, was awarded the gold medal. Clara Guerrero, who originally won bronze, was awarded the silver medal and Daria Kovalova, originally fourth in the final standings, was awarded the bronze medal.

References

Qualification
Results
Medallists

Women